Nyukhcha (meaning swan in Sami) is a rural locality (a selo) in Belomorsky District of the Republic of Karelia, Russia, located on the Nyukhcha River near the border between the Republic of Karelia and Arkhangelsk Oblast,  from the White Sea.

Rural localities in the Republic of Karelia
Belomorsky District
Kemsky Uyezd